Crossata is a genus of sea snails, marine gastropod mollusks in the family Bursidae, the frog shells.

Species
Species within the genus Crossata include:
 Crossata barbarajeanae C. L. Powell & Berschauer, 2017
 Crossata californica (Hinds, 1843)
 Crossata fuscopicta (Sowerby III, 1893)
 Crossata ventricosa (Broderip, 1833)
Species brought into synonymy
 Crossata californica (Hinds, 1843): synonym of Crossata ventricosa (Broderip, 1833)

References

 Powell & Berschauer:  Crossata (Gastropoda: Bursidae) in the eastern Pacific: A morphologic and paleontologic perspective; The Festivus vol. 49 (3); 2017.

External links

Bursidae